Leopard Creek Country Club is a Gary Player-designed country club in Malalane, South Africa. The course sits at the border of Kruger National Park, with the Crocodile River (Mpumalanga) snaking through some fairways. The course is owned by South Africa's richest man, Johann Rupert; players often stay at the nearby Sabi Sabi game lodge. The course has hosted the Alfred Dunhill Challenge.

References

Golf clubs and courses in South Africa
Golf clubs and courses designed by Gary Player